The Elk River Mountains is a rugged group of mountains in the heart of Strathcona Provincial Park on Vancouver Island, British Columbia, Canada. It has an area of 113 km2 and is part of the Vancouver Island Ranges which in turn form part of the Insular Mountains.

See also
List of mountain ranges

References

Vancouver Island Ranges